Theo Bolkart (born 4 April 1948) is a German former swimmer. He competed in the men's 200 metre breaststroke at the 1968 Summer Olympics.

References

1948 births
Living people
German male swimmers
Olympic swimmers of West Germany
Swimmers at the 1968 Summer Olympics
Sportspeople from Augsburg
German male breaststroke swimmers
20th-century German people